The Divine Horsemen were an American punk/roots band founded in 1983 by Chris D. (Desjardins), formerly of L.A. punk rock band the Flesh Eaters. The band developed a distinctive (and at the time, very new) alt country- type sound. They took their name from a voodoo term; a worshiper who is possessed by loa during a ceremony is said to be being ridden by "the divine horsemen". The term was also used as a song title by the Flesh Eaters

Desjardins re-worked several old songs by the Flesh Eaters, notably "Poison Arrow", and exercised his literary side by namechecking Chester Himes, Jim Thompson, Donald Goines, James Ellroy, Harry Crews, Ambrose Bierce and James Joyce amongst others on the track "What Is Red" from the Snake Handler LP.

Personnel
Other band members included Julie Christensen (Chris' then-wife), Matt Lee and Peter Andrus, as well as the Flesh Eaters stalwart Robyn Jameson. They were joined at times by members of L.A. punk bands like Kid Congo Powers of The Gun Club and the Cramps, Jeffrey Lee Pierce of The Gun Club. 

Divine Horsemen broke up in 1988. However, more than three decades later, the band reformed. A new album called Hot Rise of an Ice Cream Phoenix was released in 2021.

Albums

Note on Record Labels
The information below provides the record label at the time the album was released.  Most of these labels are now defunct or no longer include these albums in their catalog. They have currently been relicensed and reissued by Atavistic Records.
1984 Time Stands Still Enigma Records
Track Listing
When The Rain Comes Down
Lily White Hands
Past All Dishonor
Frankie Silver
Sanctuary
Heat From The Sun
Little Sister
Hell's Belle
Time Stands Still
Tears Fall Away
My Sin   (Chris D.- Matt Lee -Divine Horsemen)
Devil's River
Mothers Worry
Tenderest Kiss
1986 Devil's River on SST Records
Track Listing
 My Sin  (Chris D.- Matt Lee -Divine Horsemen)
 Sapphire
 Devil's River
 He Rode Right Into Town
 Come Into This Place (aka Poison Arrow Of Flame)
 Tenderest Kiss
 Love Call
 Too Young To Die
 It Doesn't Matter
 Middle Of The Night
1986 Middle of the Night on SST Records
Track Listing
 Middle Of The Night
 Field Of Stone
 If Only I Could
 Little Sister
 Mother's Worry
 It Doesn't Matter
 Gimmie Shelter
 Voodoo Idol
1987 Snake Handler on SST Records
Track Listing
 Snake Handler
 Kiss Tomorrow Goodbye
 Stone By Stone (Fire Is My Home)
 Curse Of The Crying Woman
 Someone Like You
 Fire Kiss
 What Is Red
 Blind Leading The Blind
 That's No Way To Live
1987 Handful Of Sand EP on SST Records
Track Listing
 Handful Of Sand
 Curse Of The Crying Woman
 Frankie Silver (Live)
 Past All Dishonor (live)
 Sanctuary (Live)
2021 Hot Rise of an Ice Cream Phoenix on In the Red Records
Track Listing
 Mystery Writers
 Falling Forward
 Ice Cream Phoenix
 Mind Fever
 Handful of Sand
 Any Day Now
 25th Floor
 Can't You See Me
 No Evil Star
 Strangers
 Barefoot in the Streets
 Stoney Path
 Love Cannot Die

References

External links
 A 2006 review of the 1984 release, Time Stands Still
 New and classic work by Chris D. at New Texture

American alternative country groups
Punk rock groups from California
Punk blues musical groups
American post-punk music groups
Musical groups established in 1983
Enigma Records artists